The  was a half-track armoured personnel carrier (APC) used in limited numbers by the Imperial Japanese Army (IJA) during World War II.

Development and history
The Type 1 Ho-Ha was developed in 1941 as a result of a request from the army for a vehicle that could be used to transport a squad of infantry to the battlefield protected from enemy small arms fire. Despite experiences of the Second Sino-Japanese War, armored personnel carriers were viewed as too slow compared to wheeled trucks and there was not much effort for their development in the army.

Production began in 1944 with the Type 1 Ho-Ha being an addition to the Type 1 Ho-Ki, an unrelated, yet similarly named armored tracked personnel carrier. The half-tracked Type 1 Ho-Ha was built by Hino Motors in unknown quantities.

Design
The Type 1 Ho-Ha was based on the German Sd.Kfz. 251/1 (known popularly as Hanomag), the main armoured personnel carrier of the German Army, but did not use the overlapped and interleaved road wheels of the German design's suspension. Further, it had a "vertical rear plate with a door", akin to the American M3 Half-track; however, the door itself was a copy of the German "two-leaf" design.

The Type 1 Ho-Ha had a pair of road wheels in front, supported by a pair of short caterpillar tracks to the rear. It was equipped with a tow coupling in the front and a towing hitch at the rear to haul artillery or a supply trailer. The maximum armor thickness was 8 mm with sloping armor plates. As with the Type 1 Ho-Ki, the hull was welded construction and it was "open-topped".

The Type 1 Ho-Ha carried three Type 97 light machine guns as standard armament, one on each side, just to the rear of the driver's compartment and a third mounted to the rear as an anti-aircraft weapon. All of these weapons had constricted firing arcs, which made firing directly forward or directly rearward impossible.

Combat record and post-war
The Type 1 Ho-Ha was initially deployed to China for operations in the ongoing Second Sino-Japanese War, but never in any great numbers. It was later deployed with the Japanese reinforcements in the Battle of the Philippines in 1944. Post-war, some Type 1 Ho-Ha half-tracks were modified by cutting off the rear armored section and replacing it with a flat bed. They were then used for reconstruction work in areas of the country.

Footnotes

References

External links
Taki's Imperial Japanese Army Page - Akira Takizawa
World War II Drawings

Tracked armoured personnel carriers
1 Ho-Ha
Armoured personnel carriers of Japan
World War II half-tracks
Toyota Group
Military vehicles introduced from 1940 to 1944
Armoured personnel carriers of WWII